Jack Anthony Naglieri (born 1950) is an American school psychologist and research professor at the University of Virginia. He is also a senior research scientist at the Devereux Center for Resilient Children and an emeritus professor at George Mason University, as well as a former professor at Ohio State University. He is known for his development of the Naglieri Nonverbal Ability Test and (with Jagannath Prasad Das) the Das–Naglieri cognitive assessment system.

References

External links

Living people
1950 births
21st-century American psychologists
Educational psychologists
University of Virginia faculty
LIU Post alumni
St. John's University (New York City) alumni
University of Georgia alumni
George Mason University faculty
Ohio State University faculty
20th-century American psychologists